Muhammad Hussain Panhwar(Sindhi محمد حسين پنهور ) popularly known as M.H. Panhwar was born on 25 December 1925 in village Ibrahim Panhwar district Dadu Sindh.  Professionally he specialized in ground water development, earth moving, agricultural machinery, water logging, salinity control drainage and agriculture. He worked with government of Sindh and West Pakistan as Agriculture Engineer for 12 years. From 1970 onwards till 2007 he ran a consulting company specializing in irrigation, water logging, drainage, agriculture, scientific equipment and horticulture. He had written 10 books on ground water in Sindh and many articles on Thar and Kohistan deserts of and engineering. He was also awarded Sitara e Imtiaz by the president of Pakistan

In 1964 he established a horticulture farm, specialized in fruit crops. This was converted into a research farm for introducing new fruit crops suiting climate of Sindh in 1985 and has developed many new varieties of fruit crops, which include 17 of mango 6 of lychee and many others. He was author of 36 books on culture and post-harvest of fruit crops. Many of them are not printed yet.

Considered as one man Sindhologist his hobby was studies of Sindh and he had published more than 500 pages on various aspects of Sindh. Ten more books on Sindh are ready for press. His personal library has some 50,000 non fictional books almost equally divided on Sindh, horticulture, engineering and environments etc., this library will be open for researchers by M. H. Panhwar trust which is run by his wife and sons. He widely traveled but lived at 157-C, Unit No.2, Latifabad, Hyderabad (Sindh), Pakistan, from where he ran his consultancy and research work he also maintained an office at 54-D, Block-9, Clifton, Karachi, Pakistan. He had four sons, Rafi Hussain (who died in 2004), Tariq Hussain, Sani Hussain and Muhammad Ali, all settled in USA. His first wife died and his second wife Farzana a bio-chemist has authored many books and attended many international conferences.

In June 2003 Mr. M. H. Panhwar established a trust to undertake social work in Sindh. He has transferred his home, office, agriculture land comprising a farm/orchard and other property in the name of the Trust. The trust is now managed by his wife and sons and it plans to open an agriculture research center at his farm near Tando Jam and build a new structure for research library at his house in Latifabad.

Awards
 Medal from Sindh University, for securing first number in first class in B.E. (Mech. And Elec.), 1949.
 Awarded SITARA– E–IMTIAZ by the PRESIDENT OF PAKISTAN, in 1992 for outstanding work in ENGINEERING and AGRICULTURE.
 Nominated in “WHO IS WHO IN THE WORLD” in 1987/88.
 Life Time Achievement Award for serving Motherland in History and Archaeology, 1999 by Tarqi Pasand Party.
 Lifetime Achievement Award for Services in Science of Engineering and Agriculture, August 2002 by Revivers.
 A PROUD PIONEER IN HORTICULTURE (SAYID GHULAM MUSTAFA SHAH)
 Award as top horticulturist of Pakistan by Khabreen Newspaper’s Kisantimes TV and Chawla Group May 2004.
 Medal by Sindh Graduates Association for Life Time Research on Sindh, August 2004.
 Award by Sindh Agriculture University for Life Time Service to Agriculture Science, November 2004.

Family
M.H. Panhwar was married to Farzana Panhwar. She was the President of the Sindh Rural Women’s Uplift Group, Managing Director of the Soil Testing Laboratory (Pvt) Ltd. and the Manager of Research & Development Engineers (Agro-chemistry and organic agriculture Wing).

Farzana Panhwar's Publications
 
M.H. Panhwar and Farzana Panhwar, Sustainable methods as applied to raising fruit crops, Institute of Organic and Sustainable Horticulture and Agriculture Research (IOSHAR), Hyderabad and Sindh Society for Horticultural Science, Karachi, 1995, 49 p.
 	
Farzana Panhwar, Flora of Thar and Kohistan Desert J. Sindh Quarterly, Vol.XV, No.3, 1988.
 	
Farzana Panhwar, new Resources for oleochemical and agro chemical industry.
 	
M.H. Panhwar and Farzana Panhwar, Design of an Aquaculture Enterprise, J. Pak. Agri. Vol. VII, No. 10, Oct. 1985.
 	
Farzana Panhwar, Anaerobic Digestion and use of its Residues in Agriculture, Mehran University Res. J. of Eng. J. of Eng. And Tech. Vol. 12, July 1993, No.3, pp. 18–22.
 	
Farzana Panhwar and M.H. Panhwar, Scope for Prawn Farming along Sindh Coast, J. Sci. Tech. And Development.
 	
Farzana Panhwar and M.H. Panhwar, Samphire - an edible oil crop for Sindh ‘Agriculture and Technology’ DAWN Economic and Business Review, May 27 to June 2, 1995, p. 111.
 	
Farzana Panhwar and M.H. Panhwar, Intellectual Property Rights Production, Agri. And Tech. DAWN Econ. And Business Rev., Dec., 9-15, 1995, p. III.
 	
Farzana Panhwar and M.H. Panhwar, Flying Fox a new agriculture pest, Eucalyptus and new host and fruit orchard a new target, (Sent to DAWN for Publication on 05-06-1996).
 	
Farzana Panhwar and M.H. Panhwar, Neem Versus Eucalyptus in Social Forestry of Pakistan (Sent to DAWN on 28-05-1996).
 	
M.H. Panhwar and Farzana Panhwar, 1995, Scope for Prawn Farming along Sindh Coast, PIMA Magazine, Karachi, 2 p.
 	
Sikandar Ali Arbani, Farzana Panhwar and M.H. Panhwar, Anaerobic Digestion and use of its residues in Agriculture, Department of Petroleum and Gas Engg., Mehran Univ., of Eng. And Techn., Jamshoro, 5 p.
 	
Chiku or Sapodilla the Neglected fruit of Sindh, Newsletter Sindh Society for Horticultural Science SSHS, Karachi/Hyderabad, Vol.I, No.1, 7 p.
 	
World rural Women’s Day Celebrated in Hyderabad, Sindh Agriculture, Nov., 1997, 33 p.
 	
Earthworms, Vermicasts and vermiculture, Wildlife and Environment, Oct-Dec 1997, pp. 25–29.

Death
Mr. M. H. Panhwar died on 21 April 2007 in Latifabad Hyderabad.

References 

2.  M. H. Panhwar's Personal web site

Sindhi people
Pakistani scholars